The 1924 season was Wisła Kraków's 16th year as a club.

Friendlies

A-Klasa

League standings

Notable players

  Adam Obrubański
  Henryk Reyman

External links
1924 Wisła Kraków season at historiawisly.pl

Wisła Kraków seasons
Association football clubs 1924 season
Wisla